École polyvalente Nicolas-Gatineau is a public secondary school located in Gatineau, Quebec. The school is located on a vast terrain at the corner of Boulevards Labrosse and La Vérendrye in the city's east end. It is run by the Centre de service scolaire des Draveurs. The Nicolas-Gatineau school is the largest in the province of Quebec, enrolling about 3000 students every year (now larger than Polyvalente de St-Jérôme) from Secondary 1 to 5.

Concentration programs
The school offers a series of concentrations programs in several domains including music, performing arts, sports, dance, mathematics, and sciences. These programs are only offered to students who performed above average at the primary level and only a maximum of 28 students are admitted to a particular concentration program. The sports concentration is a program called Sports-Etudes in which students can be part of a sport team or practicing any sports at a different level, including international.

References

External links
 Nicolas-Gatineau High School Website
 Site of the Phenix basketball team

Nicolas-Gatineau